Guy Kouemou (born 15 January 1970 in Bafoussam, Cameroon) is a German Aerospace -Engineer and Inventor, with a Camerounian origin.

Biography

Childhood, education and beginnings 

Date of birth January 15, 1970 in Bafoussam Cameroon (father profession: professor, Bamileke king representative, mother profession: teacher)

Dr.-Ing. Guy Leonard Kouemou is an engineer and inventor in the aerospace and medical technology sectors. He is a German citizen (Afro-German), of Cameroonian origin. He comes from the Bamileke royal house and is the king's representative of the Bangwa  and great-grandson of King NoNo Tchoutouo who has a special friendship with Kaiser Wilhelm in the years 1884 to 1918, where Cameroon was a German colony. After initial difficulties, the Bangwa peoples were especially friends with the colonial powers from Berlin, and later with them. Bangwa has been known in Germany since 1884, especially for its works of art. Several of these Bangwa art objects can be found in various museums in Germany. The most expensive object ever auctioned comes from the royal court of the bangwa (Bangwa Queen), Dr. Kouemou is himself an art collector and currently chairman of the supervisory board of the Bangwa Ethnological Museum in Cameroon and the negotiator of the Bangwa at the Humbolt Forum in Berlin regarding the refund of the works of art.

Traditional responsibilities 

Guy Kouemou is representant of the Bangoua king, with the role of the king. This means that he is capable and permitted to make decisions in the name of the Bangoua people. This is a great responsibility, but Kouemou demonstrates his engagement for the population of Cameroon and Equatorial Guinea, by investing his personal fortune to build hygienic and modern clinics in Cameroon. Consequently, Kouemou was also present at the inauguration of Rudolf Duala Manga Bell, where he inaugurated a memorial site for Manga Bell in Ulm, together with king Jean-Yves Eboumbou Douala Bell.

Career

School career 
As a small child, several members of the Bamileke royal families, who had observed a special interest and talent of the young Guy Kouemou in mathematics, physics, and astrology due to the many questions asked, decided to challenge and encourage him in this regard.

Primary school: "Ecole Publique de Bonapriso" in the port city of Douala, until 1980.

 High school: «Lycee Joss de Douala  with a high school diploma (Baccalaureat Series C) in mathematics and physics 1988.
 Due to his excellent academic achievements, Guy Kouemou received a scholarship to study in Germany. Guy Kouemou came to Munich in Germany in 1988.
 1988-1989 in Munich, at the Carl-Duisberg-Gesellschaft, graduating in July 1989 with a German certificate, examination to prove German language skills for the purpose of studying at a German university

University Education 
 1989 - 1995: Study of electrical engineering at the University of Karlsruhe with a focus on biocybernetics and bio-medical technology (KIT, then TU Karlsruhe, Fridericiana)
 He is the laureate of the German Academic Exchange Service of KIT 1996 for outstanding achievements.
 1996 - 2000 PhD (https://www.itiv.kit.edu/1504_979.php ). For a PhD in electrical engineering and information technology with a focus on artificial intelligence, hidden Markov models  and neural networks.
 Dr. Guy Kouemou speaks and writes several languages including the following eight languages Fluent languages (reading, writing)

1: French,

2: Deustch,

3: English

4: Kamtok,

5: Fefe,

6 NdaNda,

7: Medumba,

8: Douala,

 Dr. Guy Kouemou is one of the first Afro-Germans with a migration background (not born in Germany, other mother tongue, grown in a different language area) to study electrical engineering entirely in German Germany studied and obtained a doctorate in the German language. "Statement" by President Gerhard Selmayr of the university in the context of the DAAD award ceremony in Karlsruhe.

Intercultural Understandings 
Dr. Guy Kouemou is very involved in cultural associations with a focus on intercultural understanding. Thus he is honorary board member and co-founder (2000) of the German-African cultural association MAMY-Afrika e.V. In his role as the king's representative of the Bangwa, he is also the contact person and representative of the Bangwa peoples in the matter of the handling or return of African art objects in close coordination with the Humboldt Forum in Berlin and the Cameroon House in Berlin.

Family 
 Sister: Solange Kouemou (Professor Mathematics, FIU Florida, Miami)
 Ancestry: King Nono (Bangoua)

Scientific Organizations and Career 

Dr. Guy Kouemou has been a member of the Catholic academic student association Unitas since 1988. It was received in December 1988 at the Unitas Guelfia in Munich. He was then accepted into the Unitas Franco-Alemannia in Karlsruhe in 1989, where he had accepted various batches and positions in the association. He was among other things in his active times as a senior (board member), co-senior or Katholikentag co-senior. To this day he maintains very good contacts with the association as a member of the Unitas old gentry.

Deputy Chairman of the Technical Committee Radar Technology of the DGON German Society for Navigation and Positioning. 

Owner and managing partner of the medical technology companies

 Dr. Guy Kouemou owner of the medical technology companies IPTASYS GmbH, and SleepDoctor Quantum GmbH with the development of the SleepDoctor device for innovative patient and sleep monitoring using artificial intelligence.
 Since 2001, Dr. Guy Kouemou in aerospace
 2001 joined the EADS (European Aeronautical Defense and Space Company) as a radar system engineer
 2012 Technology Director Airbus Defense Sensor

 2014: "Top Ten German Future Prize, Federal President's Prize for Technology and Innovation" (Director of the "Passive Radar" technology program at Airbus Defense and Space)

Since 2017, Technology Director at HENSOLDT.

• 

• As part of this activity, Dr. Kouemou with a jury consisting of renowned German professors as well as experts from the industry for years the nationwide student competition awards for the best students nationwide in the fields of aerospace, sensor technology, security technology, radar technology, mathematics, physics and computer science

• Artikel 1

• Artikel 2

• As part of the HENSOLDT Technology Coordinator, Dr. Guy Kouemou is the project coordinator of the Horyzn initiative with the Technical University of Munich as the main sponsor,

Books, inventions, aerospace publications 

 Editor of the book Radar Technology, with over eighty-five thousand downloads, according to IntechOpen, it is one of the most widely read "downloaded" radar books in the world today.
 Author / co-author of several inventions, publications in the field of aerospace
 Patent
 Link 3
 "Hidden Markov Models, Theory and Applications".
 Support of various activities to strengthen the international radar technology community

Inventions, publications medical technology 

 Dr. Guy Kouemou is the inventor of the product family and product brand SleepDoctor as well as supporting patents and inventions. For the development of these products, innovation prizes and funding have been won by various federal / state ministries in recent years. The product is currently being presented, traded and further developed as a strong technology for combating the COVID pandemic and its consequences in Germany and abroad.
 Patent 2
 Patent 3
 SleepDoctor Functioning
 The SleepDoctor technology was developed as part of a case study as part of the Quartet project, which won the first Federal Participation Award in 2021 with Habila GmbH

Culture: Promotion of intercultural activities through African & Caribbean dance and music teachers 
 As part of his other intercultural activities, Dr. Guy Leonard Kouemou, also known as "Leo Kouemou". In this regard, he has been working as a dance and music teacher for around 20 years, especially at the Ulm Adult Education Center (https://www.vhulm.de/fileadmin/content/programm/20212022/VHU_PROGRAMMHEFT-HERBST-WINTER_2021- 2022.pdf) and in the International Federation of Germany, where he tries in this way to contribute to international understanding between people of different origins and cultures as well as age groups through music & dance.
 There he acts in particular as a lecturer for the dances Salsa, Merengue, African dances and drum teacher of the African percussion.
 Cooking together is always part of the agenda.

References

External links

 Official page 1: sleepdoctor.de
 Official Page 2: iptasys.org

German aerospace engineers
German inventors
1970 births
Living people